Science and Sorcery is the second full-length album to come from the psychedelic rock group Wolf & Cub. The album was released on 18 April 2009.

A preview of the album can be found on Wolf & Cub's MySpace, https://www.myspace.com/wolfandcub.

Track listing
"Seven Sevens"
"What Are They Running"
"One to the Other"
"Master"
"Spider's Web"
"Restless Sons"
"Hearts"
"The Loosest of Gooses (Go on Your Own)"
"Blood"
"Burden"
"Tama Swing Soul" (bonus track, iTunes extended version)

References

Wolf & Cub albums
2009 albums